The Young Europeans Reports is a series of representative surveys of young Europeans (15-24) conducted on behalf of the European Commission, and is part of the Eurobarometer.  While the first survey, conducted in 1982, covered only ten countries, the second and third included 12 members of the EU, and fourth included 15 EU countries: Belgium, Denmark, Finland, Germany, Greece, Ireland, Spain, France, Italy, Luxembourg, The Netherlands, Austria, Portugal, and Sweden, and the United Kingdom.  The surveys repeat many of the same questions, thus allowing comparison over time. They are each carried out in conjunction with the large and more general (i.e. representing all Europeans over 15, not just youth) Eurobarometer surveys, thus allowing comparison between the young population and general population.

Young Europeans 2001

The survey was launched in the fifteen member states between April 12 and May 22, 2001 under the overall co-ordination of the European Opinion Research Group, a consortium of Market and Public Opinion Research agencies, made out of INRA (Europe) and GfK Worldwide. A total of 9,760 young people were interviewed, or about 600 by country, at with the exception of Luxembourg (200), Germany (1,200: 600 in the Eastern part and 600 in the Western part) and in the United Kingdom (800: 600 in Great Britain and 200 in Northern Ireland).  For more information, read the official summary.

Young Europeans 1997

The report examines young people's attitudes on matters which affect them directly, and
towards the European Union. The population sample was aged between 15 and 24. There
are two main chapters. The first illustrates the everyday lifestyle of young Europeans, looking at their
religious beliefs, participation in community life, views on employment and
unemployment, education, travel, knowledge of languages, etc. The second focuses mainly
on the way they perceive the European Union and what it has contributed.

In each country, these questions were put to a representative sample of the national
population aged between 15 and 24. A total of 9,400 young people were interviewed, an
average of around 600 per country, except in Germany (1,200: 600 in former East Germany
and 600 in former West Germany), the United Kingdom (800: 600 in Great Britain and 200
in Northern Ireland) and Luxembourg (200).

Young Europeans 1990
This is the first of the studies to include the ex-GDR after its then recent integration into the EU. This survey was conducted in conjunction with the more general Euro Barometer No.34.   The main topics of this study include everyday life, young Europeans and society, openness to foreign countries, knowledge of Europe, studies, and entering the work world.  A total of 7,600 youths were questioned, or 600 per country (with East Germany and West Germany each receiving 600 surveys, Northern Ireland receiving its own 200 independent of Great Britain, and Luxembourd receiving only 200 surveys.).

Young Europeans 1987

This study surveyed 7,000 young people (aged 15–24) during October–November 1987.  The survey was conducted in conjunction with Eurobarometer 28.  The main topics include personal life, perception of political and social problems, looking abroad, Europe, studies, career guidance, and work.

Young Europeans 1982

Eurobarometer 127: 15- to 24-year-olds (2002)

This Eurobarometer Flash survey was carried out between 27 May and 16 June 2002 on a representative sample of 7,558 young people.  The main topics included the functioning of the European union, as well as young people's vision of Europe.  For a summary of the findings, read the official summary.

Youth in New Europe Report

The Youth in New Europe is a study of youth (aged 15–24) in EU candidate countries commissioned by the European Commission. It is based on the survey model of the Standard Eurobarometer, and thus allows a unique comparison between the societies which are recent members of the EU (and which are still striving to become members of the EU) and the societies of the established EU.  One can compare the results of the Youth in New Europe to the other Eurobarometer Reports on Young People, however Youth in new Europe is distinct from Young People series.

The Candidate Countries Eurobarometer (CC-EB) continuously tracks support for EU membership, and the change of attitudes related to European issues, in the Candidate Countries.  The Youth in New Europe report covers the results of the survey conducted in April 2003 in the 13 Candidate Countries.  These countries, and the number of interviewed youth in each, are:

In each of the 13 Candidate Countries, the survey was carried out by national institutes associated with and
coordinated by The Gallup Organization, Hungary.

Notes

External links
 Eurobarometer's archive which includes the Young Europeans Series
 Candidate Countries Eurobarometer, where the report Youth in New Europe is available.
 Press Release of the Youth in new Europe Report
 Summary of the Youth in New Europe Report, which emphasizes comparison between EU Member countries and candidate countries

European Union youth policy
Youth in Europe
Works about adolescence